Tomasz Bednarek (born 12 November 1981) is a professional tennis player from Poland.

Career
He is a doubles' specialist. He reached his career-high doubles ranking of No. 44 on 14 April 2014. His current partner is Mateusz Kowalczyk, but Bednarek partnered among others with his compatriots Maciej Diłaj, Michał Przysiężny and Slovakian Filip Polášek and Igor Zelenay. Bednarek partnered with Benoit Paire at the 2014 Wimbledon Championships, where they lost in the first round.

When the former footballer Paolo Maldini and his coach Stefano Landonio made a professional tennis debut, Bednarek and partner David Pel recorded a victory over them in 42 minutes dropping two games during the match.

ATP career finals

Doubles: 4 (4 runner-ups)

Challengers and futures titles (20)

Doubles performance timeline

Notes

References

External links
 
 
 Official site of Bednarek/Kowalczyk team

1981 births
Living people
Polish male tennis players
People from Pabianice
Sportspeople from Łódź Voivodeship
21st-century Polish people